The Industry Classification Benchmark (ICB) is an industry classification taxonomy launched by Dow Jones and FTSE in 2005 and now used by FTSE International and STOXX.  It is used to segregate markets into sectors within the macroeconomy.  The ICB uses a system of 11 industries, partitioned into 20 supersectors, which are further divided into 45 sectors, which then contain 173 subsectors.

The ICB is used globally (though not universally) to divide the market into increasingly specific categories, allowing investors to compare industry trends between well-defined subsectors.  The ICB replaced the legacy FTSE and Dow Jones classification systems on 3 January 2006, and is used today by the NASDAQ, NYSE and several other markets around the globe. All ICB sectors are represented on the New York Stock Exchange except Equity Investment Instruments (8980) and Nonequity Investment Instruments (8990).

Dow Jones divested itself of its 50% interest in the ICB in 2011 and announced it was creating its own version of it.

Classification

See also
 Australian and New Zealand Standard Industrial Classification
 Global Industry Classification Standard
 International Standard Industrial Classification
 North American Industry Classification System
 Standard Industrial Classification
 Thomson Reuters Business Classification

References

Industry classifications
Financial markets
FTSE Group stock market indices